Aponogeton rigidifolius is a species of freshwater plant native to Sri Lanka.

Description
The margins of the leaves are flat to slightly undulate with a distinct midrib. In colour they are a dark green to reddish colour. The inflorescence has a single spike with white flowers and small fruits.

Cultivation and uses
This species is unique amongst the Aponogetons in having an elongated rhizome rather than a tuber; the rhizome creeps along the surface, and from it new leaves sprout. This rhizome can be divided. It needs no rest period but is slow growing, though tough once established. It needs only a moderate light, tropical temperatures, and will tolerate harder water than most other Aponogetons. It is not commonly available but a good plant for the middle to background of an aquarium. It flowers rarely in aquariums.

References

External links
 Karen Randell - Aponogetons
 Flowering conditions in an aquarium
 cultivation

rigidifolius
Freshwater plants
Flora of Sri Lanka